Satterlee may refer to:

People with the name
Charles Satterlee (1875–1918), officer in the United States Coast Guard during World War I
Henry Y. Satterlee (1843–1908), American Episcopal bishop
Herbert L. Satterlee (1863–1947), American lawyer and government official
Kevin Satterlee (born 1968), President of Idaho State University
Marion Satterlee, American botanical artist
Richard Sherwood Satterlee (1798–1880), medical officer in the United States Army
Walter Satterlee (1844-1908), American painter
Satterlee Clark Jr. (1816-1881), American politician

Other uses
 USS Satterlee (DD-190), a Clemson-class destroyer, commissioned in 1919 and decommissioned in 1922
 USS Satterlee (DD-626), a Gleaves-class destroyer, commissioned in 1943 and decommissioned in 1946
 Satterlee General Hospital, a hospital in Philadelphia, Pennsylvania

See also
Satterly (includes Satterley)